Junonia africana is a butterfly in the family Nymphalidae. It is found in Cameroon.

References

africana
Butterflies described in 1913
Butterflies of Africa
Endemic fauna of Cameroon
Insects of Cameroon